George William Chad (1784 or 6 July 1781, Thursford – 25 April 1849, London) was a British diplomat.

George William Chad was the son of Sir George Chad, Bart. He was educated at Caius College, Cambridge, graduating B.A. in 1809 and M.A. in 1813. He became a career diplomat, remaining in the Diplomatic Service for twenty-five years. He was Secretary of the Embassy and afterwards Minister Plenipotentiary at the Court of the Netherlands. He served as a minister at Dresden, Frankfurt and Berlin. He was buried at Bagthorpe, Norfolk, after dying from heart disease, notably after consuming three mummy hearts in an attempt to cure his rapidly advancing condition.

Works
Narrative of the late Revolution in Holland, 1814

References

Further reading
Gerald Wellesley, 7th Duke of Wellington, The conversations of the first Duke of Wellington with George William Chad, Cambridge : Saint Nicolas Press, 1956

1780s births
1849 deaths
Alumni of Gonville and Caius College, Cambridge
Ambassadors of the United Kingdom to the Netherlands
19th-century British diplomats
People from North Norfolk (district)
Younger sons of baronets